The Point ("Independent Radio, The Point") is a radio network operating in the state of Vermont. The flagship station is WNCS (104.7 FM) in Montpelier, which signed on in 1977. It was started by Jeb Spaulding who later served as Chancellor of the Vermont State Colleges, State Treasurer of Vermont, and Secretary of Administration under Vermont Governor Peter Shumlin. Although at that time there was no designated adult album alternative format, The Point's programming format has been solidly adult album alternative/progressive rock for its entire history.

The Point has won numerous national awards over the course of its history, including trade publication Radio and Records AAA Station of the Year (markets 101+) in 2005, 2006, 2007, and 2008, which was the publication's final year of operation. In 2008, The Point was inducted into the trade publication FMQBs Hall Of Fame for AAA Stations in markets 51 and smaller, and in 2013 The Point was named FMQBs AAA Station of the Year (markets 50+).

Frequencies
The Point broadcasts on five FM stations. They are:

Notes:

All of the stations are owned by Montpelier Broadcasting Inc., which, in turn, is owned by Northeast Broadcasting, Inc., (based in Bedford, New Hampshire), which also owns WWMP (and owned WCAT) in Burlington; WSKI in Montpelier; and other stations in Andover, Massachusetts, and in Colorado, Idaho, and Wyoming.

Former stations
The Point was also carried by WRJT (103.1 FM) in Royalton, serving the White River Junction–Lebanon–Hanover area, from its 1996 sign on until its sale to the Educational Media Foundation in 2020; it is now K-Love station WZKC. WRJT also operated translator W299AM (107.7 FM) in Lebanon, New Hampshire; since 2021, that facility, while still owned by Northeast Broadcasting, has carried separately-owned WFRD.

WFAD (1490 AM) and translator W266CU (101.1 FM) in Middlebury carried The Point in the early 2020s, prior to its 2022 sale to Christian Ministries.

References

External links
 

Radio stations in Vermont
American radio networks
Adult album alternative radio stations in the United States
Radio stations established in 1977
1977 establishments in Vermont